The 2021 Greenlandic local elections were held on 6 April 2021 for the 5 municipal councils. In the 2017 elections, Forward remained the largest party. The 2021 Greenlandic general election, along with District council and parish elections, will be held on the same day. In the 2017 elections there were 81 seats up for election.

Results

Results of municipal elections

Number of councillors and political parties in the regional Municipal Councils 

Results By Individual Municipality

Mayors in the regional municipalities 
Mayors of Greenland's 5 municipalities are the head of council meetings.

Old and new mayors in the regional municipalities

References 

Local elections in Greenland
2021 elections in Denmark
Greenland
2021 in Greenland
April 2021 events in North America
April 2021 events in Denmark